Rebecca Elizabeth Breeds (born 17 June 1987) is an Australian actress, known for her roles as Cassie Cometti in the third series of Blue Water High, as series regular Ruby Buckton in the soap opera Home and Away, Aurora de Martel in The Originals and its spin-off Legacies, and as recurring character Nicole in seasons 6 and 7 of Pretty Little Liars. In 2021, Breeds was cast as Clarice Starling in the CBS series Clarice.

Early life
Breeds was born in Sydney. She attended St Andrew's Cathedral School, where she was made Drama Captain. 

For six months, she studied a double degree in music and performing arts at University of New South Wales, but she deferred her studies for a film role.

Career
Breeds began her acting career with appearances in television commercials. She landed her first lead role as Leah Pointin in the 2008 Australian film Newcastle.

Breeds played Cassie Cometti in the third series of Blue Water High. It was during filming on Blue Water High that she successfully auditioned for the role of Ruby Buckton on Home and Away, and her first scenes aired in June 2008. For her portrayal of Ruby, Breeds earned two Logie Award nominations, including Most Popular Actress in 2010. In June 2012, TV Week's Erin Miller reported that Breeds had filmed her final scenes and had left Home and Away after four years. The actress made her last appearance as Ruby during the episode broadcast on 15 August 2012.

In August 2012, Nellie Andreeva from Deadline.com announced that Breeds had been cast in Rob Greenberg's We Are Men as Abby Russo. We Are Men marked her first US television role, however, the show was cancelled after poor ratings. Breeds also appears in the 2013 Hindi-language Bollywood film Bhaag Milkha Bhaag. In 2015, Breeds appeared in the sixth season of Pretty Little Liars and was cast as Aurora in the supernatural series The Originals.

Breeds played Molly Meldrum's fiancée Camille in the 2016 miniseries Molly. On 19 February 2016, it was announced that Breeds would star in Miranda's Rights, a legal soap about a group of lawyers who work and live together. Breeds was cast as the title character Miranda Coale after a competitive audition process, however the pilot was never aired. Breeds plays one of two leads in Ben Elton's 2017 romantic comedy film Three Summers. She also appears in Partho Sen-Gupta's 2018 feature film Slam.

On 26 February 2020, she was cast as Clarice Starling in the CBS series Clarice, which is set three years after the events of The Silence of the Lambs. The series was approved by CBS on 8 May 2020 for the 2020–2021 television season. CBS planned to relocate Clarice to Paramount+ for its second season, but in June 2021 it was announced the deal was "unlikely" to happen. In late 2021, Breeds reprised her role of Aurora de Martel in season 4 of The Originals spin-off Legacies. Jillian Fabiano of E! Online confirmed that Breeds would have a recurring role on the series.

Personal life
In 2009, Breeds began dating her Home and Away co-star Luke Mitchell. The couple announced their engagement in May 2012 and they married in January 2013.

Filmography

Film

Television

Awards and nominations

References

External links

1987 births
Living people
21st-century Australian actresses
Australian child actresses
Australian expatriate actresses in the United States
Australian film actresses
Australian television actresses
Actresses from Sydney
People from the Sutherland Shire